Porfirio Altamirano Ramírez (born May 17, 1952), nicknamed "El Guajiro" is a Nicaraguan former  professional baseball right-handed middle relief pitcher, who played in Major League Baseball (MLB) for the Philadelphia Phillies (1982–83) and Chicago Cubs (1984). He was inducted into the Nicaraguan Sports Hall of Fame, on August 2, 1994.

Born in Ciudad Darío, Nicaragua, Altamirano first became successful in his native country in the 1970s, when he pitched for the Estelí team in the Nicaraguan National League, breaking many records. Altamirano shut out the powerful Cuban national team in a tournament in Colombia, in 1976, beating them 5–0 and also shut out the USA team 4–0, in 1977, in a tournament played in Nicaragua; these considerable feats went a long way to his being recognized as one of Nicaragua's best amateur pitchers.

Although not equipped with an overpowering arm, Altamirano had an 87–92 MPH fastball and mixed in a slider and an occasional curveball. He was an ideal reliever for a bullpen-by-committee because if his ability to pitch two or three innings at a time, setting the table for a variety of teammates, from Sparky Lyle to Tug McGraw to Lee Smith.

Altamirano made his major league debut on May 9, 1982, and played in 60 games over two seasons for the Philadelphia Phillies. He was traded along with Gary Matthews and Bob Dernier from the Phillies to the Cubs for Bill Campbell and Mike Diaz on March 27, 1984.

In his three-year MLB career, Altamirano compiled a 7–4 record with 57 strikeouts, a 4.03 earned run average (ERA), two saves, and  innings, in 65 games pitched.

Altamirano also pitched as a closer in the Venezuelan professional league, in the mid-1980s for Aguilas de Zulia.

See also
Players from Nicaragua in MLB

References

External links

Porfi Altamirano at SABR (Baseball BioProject)
Porfi Altamirano at Pura Pelota (Venezuelan Professional Baseball League)

Chicago Cubs players
Philadelphia Phillies players
Nicaraguan expatriate baseball players in the United States
Miami Amigos players
Portland Beavers players
Iowa Cubs players
Oklahoma City 89ers players
Major League Baseball pitchers
Major League Baseball players from Nicaragua
People from Matagalpa Department
1952 births
Living people